Gonzo pornography is a style of pornographic film that attempts to place the viewer directly into the scene. Jamie Gillis is considered to have started the gonzo pornography genre with his On the Prowl series of films.

The name is a reference to gonzo journalism, in which the reporter is part of the event taking place. By comparison, gonzo pornography puts the camera right into the action, often with one or more of the participants filming and performing sexual acts, without the usual separation between camera and performers seen in conventional porn and cinema.

Gonzo porn is influenced by amateur pornography, and it tends to use far fewer full-body/wide shots in favor of more close-ups (see: reality pornography). The loose and direct camera work often includes tight shots of the genitalia, unlike some traditional porn.

Similarities to point-of-view (POV) pornography

Point-of-view pornography (POV) is adult entertainment filmed to look as if the watcher were experiencing the sex act themselves. In POV porn, the shooting style is generally similar to gonzo pornography, with the person receiving sexual gratification holding the camera themselves—aiming it down at the actor who is performing the sex act. This style of filming is in contrast to having a separate, third-person camera crew filming all the action. The effect is to give the viewer the sense that they are experiencing the sex acts that they are watching, as opposed to simply watching others as a voyeur.

POV porn sometimes breaks the strict point-of-view convention. For instance, Amateur Allure has a trademark shot where the sexually performing cameraman circles a handycam around the sexually performing model's head. This yields a view that would not be obtainable directly through the eyes of a person while experiencing the sex act. There is, however, no third-party camera work involved.

POV pornography in Japan
Hamedori is a genre of Japanese pornography in which a male adult video (AV) actor or director serves as the camera operator. Hamedori-type videos were produced from the beginnings of Japanese AV in the early 1980s. The term "hamedori" came into use about 1988–1989, but it was only a small niche area until it was popularized at V&R Planning by director Company Matsuo.

Matsuo started working in the genre in 1991, saying that this intimate technique was a natural way for him to shoot in order to show his feelings for the woman and to "get her to open up about herself, to show her true emotions". Matsuo used amateur actresses in his videos, and he usually traveled to their hometowns for the filming. He talked to them extensively on camera so that both he and the viewer can come to know them before any sex scenes. A large part of the popularity of these videos is seeing how regular and normal the women are in real life. As amateurs in a single segment of a multi-part video, the actresses are typically paid about 50,000 (around 500).

Awards

The X-Rated Critics Organization has had a "Best POV Release" award (2005–2009) and a "Best POV Series" (since 2010) in their annual XRCO awards. The AVN Awards have "Best POV Series", "Best POV Release" and "Best POV Sex Scene" awards.

Notable gonzo pornography directors
 

 Mike Adriano
 Belladonna
 Ashley Blue
 Seymore Butts
 Tom Byron
 Christoph Clark
 Raul Cristian
 Ben Dover
 Erik Everhard
 Manuel Ferrara
 Jamie Gillis
 Max Hardcore
 Mike John
 Lexington Steele
 Joanna Angel
 Jules Jordan
 John Leslie
 Rodney Moore
 Pat Myne
 Ed Powers
 Shane (Shane's World)
 Rocco Siffredi
 Joey Silvera
 John Stagliano (Buttman)
 Randy West
 Pierre Woodman

See also

 Reality pornography

References

Further reading
 

 
Pornography by genre